Zineb is the chemical compound with the formula {Zn[S2CN(H)CH2CH2N(H)CS2]}n. Structurally, it is classified as a coordination polymer and a dithiocarbamate complex.   This pale yellow solid is used as fungicide.

Production and applications
It is produced by treating ethylene bis(dithiocarbamate) sodium salt, "nabam", with zinc sulfate. This procedure can be carried out by mixing nabam and zinc sulfate in a spray tank. 
Its uses include control of downy mildews, rusts, and redfire disease. In the US it was once registered as a "General Use Pesticide", however all registrations were voluntarily cancelled following an EPA special review. It continues to be used in many other countries.

Structure
Zineb is a polymeric complex of zinc with a dithiocarbamate. The polymer is composed of Zn(dithiocarbamate)2 subunits linked by an ethylene (-CH2CH2-) backbone.  A reference compound is [Zn(S2CNEt2)2]2, which features a pair of tetrahedral Zn centers  bridged by one sulfur center.

See also
Metam sodium - A related dithiocarbamate salt which is also used as a fungicide.
Maneb - ethylene bis(dithiocarbamate) with manganese instead of zinc.
Mancozeb - A common fungicide containing Zineb and Maneb.

References

External links

Fungicides
Endocrine disruptors
Zinc compounds
Dithiocarbamates